The PGM-19 Jupiter was the first nuclear armed, medium-range ballistic missile (MRBM) of the United States Air Force (USAF). It was a liquid-propellant rocket using RP-1 fuel and LOX oxidizer, with a single  Rocketdyne LR79-NA (model S-3D) rocket engine producing  of thrust. It was armed with the  W49 nuclear warhead. The prime contractor was the Chrysler Corporation.

The Jupiter was originally designed by the US Army, which was looking for a highly accurate missile designed to strike enemy states such as Communist China and USSR. The US Navy also expressed an interest in the design as an SLBM but left the collaboration to work on their Polaris. Jupiter retained the short, squat shape intended to fit in naval submarines.

Development history

Initial concept
Jupiter traces its history ultimately to the PGM-11 Redstone missile, the US's first nuclear ballistic missile. While it was entering service, Wernher von Braun's Army Ballistic Missile Agency (ABMA) team at Redstone Arsenal began to consider an upgraded version using the LR89 rocket engine being developed by Rocketdyne for the Air Force's Atlas missile project.

As Rocketdyne continued working on the LR89, it appeared that it could be improved to increase thrust over the promised . During this same period, the weight of nuclear warheads was rapidly falling, and by combining this engine with a warhead of  they could build a single-stage missile able to reach  while being significantly less complicated and easier to handle in the field than a two-stage model. This engine was continually upgraded, ultimately reaching . This last model, known to the Army as the NAA-150-200, became much better known by its Rocketdyne model number, S-3.

Navy SLBM interest

Around the same time, the US Navy was looking for ways to join the nuclear club, and had been focusing mostly on cruise missiles and similar systems. Some consideration had been given to the use of ballistic missiles on ships, but Admiral Hyman Rickover, "father" of the nuclear submarine, was skeptical that this could be done, and was worried it would take up funding needed elsewhere. Another skeptic of missiles was the Chief of Naval Operations, Robert B. Carney.

Lower-ranking Navy officials became increasingly interested when the Army and Air Force began serious development of their long-range missiles. In an attempt to bypass high-ranking Navy officials, who remained uninterested in the concept, the Navy liaison to the Killian Committee championed the cause. The Committee took up the concept, and in September 1955 released a report calling for the development of a sea-based missile system.

The Navy's interest in missiles had been greatly increased with the August 1955 appointment of Admiral Arleigh Burke to replace Carney. Burke was convinced the Navy had to get into the missile field as rapidly as possible, and was well aware that the Air Force would oppose any such endeavor. Instead, he approached the Army, and found that the proposed Jupiter fit the range goals needed by the Navy.

Development begins
The issue of who would be given the go-ahead to build an IRBM by this time had reached the Joint Chiefs of Staff (JCS), who proved unable to reach a decision. This forced the Secretary of Defense Charles Erwin Wilson to move ahead without an official recommendation from the military. He saw the Navy interest as a reasonable argument to continue the Army project in any event, and on 8 November 1955 approved both programs. The Air Force would develop IRBM No. 1, or SM-75 (for "strategic missile"), the Army would develop their design as IRBM No. 2 or SM-78. The Navy would develop systems to launch the Army missile from ships and, later, submarines.

The requirement for shipboard storage and launching dictated the size and shape of the Jupiter. This precluded it from being carried aboard contemporary cargo aircraft, limiting it to sea and road. Even with this change, they were unable to reduce its length enough to suit the Navy. This was rejected, and after briefly considering a  version, finally settled on the  version.

On 2 December 1955, the secretaries of the Army and Navy publicly announced the dual Army–Navy program to create a land- and sea-based MRBM. In April 1956, as part of a widespread effort to assign names to various missile projects, the Army's effort was given the name "Jupiter" and the Air Force's became "Thor".

Accuracy and mission
This was in keeping with the Army's view of nuclear weapons, which was in effect more powerful artillery. They saw the weapons as part of a large-scale battle in Europe, in which both sides would use nuclear weapons during a limited war that did not include the use of strategic weapons on each other's cities. In that case, "if wars were to be kept limited, such weapons would have to be capable of hitting only tactical targets." This approach saw the support of a number of influential theorists, notably Henry Kissinger, and was seized on as a uniquely Army mission.

The original goal for the new longer-range design was to match Redstone's accuracy at the Jupiter's much-extended range. As development continued, it became clear the ABMA team, under the direction of Fritz Mueller, could improve on that. This led to a period in which "The Army would lay down a particular accuracy, and wait for our arguments whether it was possible. We had to promise a lot, but were fortunate."

This process ultimately delivered a superior design intended to provide  accuracy at the full range, an order of magnitude better than Redstone and four times better than the best INS designs being used by the Air Force. The system was so accurate that a number of observers expressed their skepticism about the Army's goals, with the WSEG suggesting they were hopelessly optimistic.

The Air Force was dead set against Jupiter. They argued that nuclear weapons were not simply new artillery, and that their employment would immediately trigger a response that might result in a strategic exchange. This would especially be true if the Army launched a long-range weapon like Jupiter, which could reach cities in the Soviet Union and could not immediately be distinguished as attacking a military or civilian target. They suggested that any such launch would trigger a strategic response, and as such, the Army should not be given any long-range weapons.

However, as von Braun's team went from success to success, and with Atlas still years from operational deployment, it was clear that Jupiter represented a threat to the Air Force's desired hegemony over strategic forces. This led to them starting their own MRBM program Thor, in spite of having repeatedly dismissed the medium-range role in the past. The fighting between the Army and Air Force grew through 1955 and 1956 until practically every missile system the Army was involved in was being attacked in the press.

Navy exit

The Navy was concerned from the start about Jupiter's cryogenic propellants, but at the time there was no other option. Given the size and weight of contemporary nuclear weapons, only a large liquid-fuel rocket engine provided the energy needed to meet the Navy's range goal of launching from safe areas in the Atlantic Ocean. They justified the risk thus:

All of this changed radically in the summer of 1956, when Project Nobska brought together leading scientists to consider antisubmarine warfare. As part of this workshop, Edward Teller stated that by 1963 a 1 megaton warhead would be reduced to only . Rocketry experts at the same meeting suggested that an intermediate-range weapon carrying one of these weapons could be built using solid propellant.

The Navy announced their desire to develop their own missile that summer, initially under the name Jupiter-S. After intensive follow-up studies, the Navy withdrew from the Jupiter program in December 1956. This was officially announced by the Army in January 1957. In its place, the Navy began development of what was then known as the Fleet Ballistic Missile Program, and the missile was later renamed Polaris, their first submarine-launched ballistic missile (SLBM). Rickover, one of the few remaining skeptics, was won over by pointing out that a properly designed submarine was needed specifically for this role, and he would be called upon to produce it. Rickover was from that point on a staunch ally of the program.

Saved from cancellation

On 4 October 1957, the Soviets successfully launched Sputnik I from their R-7 Semyorka ICBM. The US was aware of these efforts and had already talked to the press about it, suggesting that if the Soviets launched a satellite first it would be no big deal. To their surprise, the press exploded in rage over the affair. Having spent over a decade working on similar missiles, like Atlas, the fact that the Soviets could beat them was a serious blow, and prompted a deep review of the ongoing programs.

One problem noted from the start was that the internecine fighting between the Army and Air Force was leading to significant duplication of effort, with little to show for it. The Department of Defense responded by creating the Advanced Research Projects Agency (ARPA), whose initial mission was to look over all of the ongoing projects and select ones based solely on their technical merits.

At the same time, the fighting had begun to have negative political effects. In a 26 November 1956 memorandum, recently appointed US Secretary of Defense Charles Erwin Wilson attempted to end the fighting. His solution was to limit the Army to weapons with  range, and those involved in surface-to-air defense to only . The memo also placed limits on Army air operations, severely limiting the weight of the aircraft it was allowed to operate. To some degree this simply formalized what had largely already been the case in practice, but Jupiter fell outside the range limits and the Army was forced to hand them to the Air Force.

The Air Force, of course, had no interest in taking over a weapon system they had long argued was not needed. However, ARPA's studies clearly showed it was an excellent system, and as it was ready to enter production, any Air Force thoughts about canceling it were immediately quashed. New orders for 32 prototypes and 62 operational missiles were soon placed, bringing the total number of Jupiters to be built to 94. The first, hand-built at ABMA, would be delivered by the end of FY57, and the first production models from Chrysler's Michigan Ordnance Missile Plant near Warren, Michigan between FY58 and FY61.

Lingering complaints
A primary complaint about Jupiter was that the design's shorter range placed it within relatively easy striking distance of Soviet weapons, both missiles and aircraft. Thor, based in the UK, would likely have more warning of an impending attack. This is precisely the reason that the Army spent considerable effort on making Jupiter mobile, in order to make surprise attacks difficult without prior aerial reconnaissance missions.

However, in November 1958, the Air Force decided Jupiter would be launched from fixed emplacements. Army General Maxwell Taylor argued this was done deliberately, noting that:

To offset the possibility of air attack, the systems were upgraded to allow a launch within 15 minutes of a launch order.

Testing history
Rocketdyne tested the first S-3 engine at their Santa Susana, California facilities in November 1955. A mock-up was delivered to ABMA in January 1956, followed by the first prototype engines in July 1956. Testing of these engines began in September 1956 at ABMA's new Power Plant Test Stand. This demonstrated a number of problems with unstable combustion, leading to the failure of four engines by November. To continue testing, the engine was temporarily derated back to 135,000 lbf and was successfully tested at this level in January 1957. Continued work on the engine developed several sub-versions, finally reaching the design goal of 150,000 lbf in the S-3D model.

The 135,000 pound engine, also used in the first Thor and Atlas tests, had conical thrust chambers, but the 150,000 pound model switched to bell-shaped thrust chambers. Unlike Thor and Atlas, which had two small vernier engines for roll control, Jupiter gimbaled the turbine exhaust. The early test model Jupiters had two small gas jets powered off the turbine exhaust, the gimbaled exhaust pipe not being introduced until late 1958.

Static tests
In 1954 Test Laboratory director Karl Heimburg began construction of the Static Test Stand for Redstone testing. This was still under construction when it was re-purposed for Jupiter, and finally completed in January 1957. A Jupiter was installed in the stand that month, and fired for the first time on 12 February 1957. This almost ended in disaster when a small explosion went off in the liquid oxygen (LOX) pump, and as the missile sat there the LOX boiled off and threatened to burst the tanks. The day was saved when the foreman, Paul Kennedy, ran to the missile and connected a pressure line to drain the oxygen buildup in the tank. The problem was later traced to the lubricant used in the pump, which tended to burst into flames in contact with LOX. A new lubricant was introduced, along with a series of changes to the test stand to help retain control in these situations.

Flight tests
Redstone testing moved to these pads from the smaller LC-4 on 20 April 1955, with the launch of the seventh Redstone from LC-6. In late 1957 a set of parallel railway tracks running just east of the pads was added, allowing an A-frame gantry to be rolled to any of the four pads.

Jupiters were delivered to the Cape strapped to wheeled trailers and flown to the Cape's "Skid Strip" on C-124s. They were then moved to Hangar R at the Cape Industrial Area where the nose cone was mated with the missile, and electrical checkout was performed. Just to the north of the launch area was the Air Force's LC-17 for Thor, and LC-18 used for Thor and the Navy's Vanguard. After the Army's head start, the Air Force had since caught up and attempted its first Thor launch on 26 January 1957, which ended with the missile exploding on the launch pad.

Jupiter test flights commenced with the launch of AM-1A (ABMA Missile 1A) on 1 March 1957 from LC-5. This missile was equipped with the lower-thrust interim engine. The vehicle performed well until past 50 seconds into launch when control started to fail, leading to breakup at T+73 seconds. It was deduced that turbopump exhaust was sucked up by the partial vacuum in the area behind the missile and began to burn in the tail section. The heat burned through the control wiring, so extra insulation was added there on future flights. An identical AM-1B was quickly readied and launched on 26 April. AM-1B's flight went entirely according to plan up to T+70 seconds when the missile started becoming unstable in flight and finally broke up at T+93 seconds. The failure was deduced to have been the result of propellant slosh due to bending modes induced by the steering maneuvers needed to perform the flight trajectory. The solution to this problem involved testing several types of baffles in a Jupiter center section until discovering a suitable type for both the LOX and fuel tanks.

The third Jupiter, also numbered AM-1, was quickly equipped with the baffles and launched on 31 May, slightly over a month after AM-1B, traveling a full  downrange. This version had a slightly improved S-3 engine with  thrust. AM-3 flew from LC-26B on 23 October, including the ablative heat shield and the new ST-90 INS.

AM-3A launched on 26 November and all went according to plan until T+101 seconds when engine thrust abruptly terminated. The missile broke up at T+232 seconds. On 18 December, AM-4 lost thrust T+117 seconds and fell into the ocean  downrange. These failures were traced to an inadequate turbopump design that resulted in a string of failures in the Jupiter, Thor, and Atlas programs, all of which used a variant of the same Rocketdyne engine. Testing then paused for five months while Rocketdyne came up with a number of fixes and the Army retrofitted all its Jupiters with the redesigned pumps. In spite of these failures, Jupiter was declared operational on 15 January 1958.

Taking the time to also fully rate the engine to 150,000 lbf, the new engine was first flown on AM-5 on 18 May 1958 from LC-26B, reaching a planned . AM-5 also carried the real nose cone design, which separated from the rocket body, spun up the warhead, and separated to allow the warhead to continue on its own.

AM-6B included both the production nose cone and the ST-90 INS during its launch from LC-26B on 17 July 1958. This time the Navy recovered it only  from its planned splash down point  downrange. AM-7 flew  on 27 August, testing a new solid fuel rocket for spinup, replacing the older hydrogen peroxide model. AM-9 was launched on 10 October, the first Jupiter to carry the fully functional turbine exhaust roll control system. The flight failed however; a pinhole leak in the thrust transducer area started a thrust section fire and loss of vehicle control. The Range Safety Officer destroyed the missile at T+49 seconds. 

Afterwards, there was only one more failure in the Jupiter program, AM-23 on 15 September 1959, which developed a leak in a nitrogen bottle that led to depressurization of the RP-1 tank and almost immediate loss of control at liftoff. The missile wobbled from side to side and the RP-1 tank began to break apart starting at T+7 seconds. The Jupiter flipped upside down, dumping out the contents of the RP-1 tank, followed by total vehicle breakup at T+13 seconds, just before the Range Safety Officer could issue the flight termination command. Flying debris struck and damaged a Juno II on the adjacent LC-5. This particular launch was carrying a biological nose cone with mice and other specimens (which did not survive).

Through the early 1960s, a number of Jupiters were launched by the forces of other countries, as well as the Air Force, as part of ongoing combat training. The last launch of this sort was by the Italian Air Force, CM-106, which took place from LC-26B on 23 January 1963.

Biological flights

Jupiter missiles were used in a series of suborbital biological test flights. On 13 December 1958, Jupiter AM-13 was launched from Cape Canaveral, Florida with a Navy-trained South American squirrel monkey named Gordo on board. The nose cone recovery parachute failed to operate and Gordo did not survive the flight. Telemetry data sent back during the flight showed that the monkey survived the 10 g (100 m/s²) of launch, eight minutes of weightlessness and 40 g (390 m/s²) of reentry at 10,000 mph (4.5 km/s). The nose cone sank  downrange from Cape Canaveral and was not recovered.

Another biological flight was launched on 28 May 1959. Aboard Jupiter AM-18 were a seven-pound (3.2 kg) American-born rhesus monkey, Able, and an 11-ounce (310 g) South American squirrel monkey, Baker. They withstood accelerations of 38 g and were weightless for about nine minutes. A top speed of 10,000 mph (4.5 km/s) was reached during their 16-minute flight.

After splashdown the Jupiter nosecone carrying Able and Baker was recovered by the seagoing tug USS Kiowa (ATF-72). The monkeys survived the flight in good condition. Able died four days after the flight from a reaction to anesthesia while undergoing surgery to remove an infected medical electrode. Baker lived for many years after the flight, finally succumbing to kidney failure on 29 November 1984 at the United States Space and Rocket Center in Huntsville, Alabama.

Operational deployment

In April 1958, under the command of President Eisenhower, the U.S. Department of Defense notified the Air Force it had tentatively planned to deploy the first three Jupiter squadrons (45 missiles) in France. However, in June 1958 the new French President Charles de Gaulle refused to accept basing any Jupiter missiles in France. This prompted U.S. to explore the possibility of deploying the missiles in Italy and Turkey. The Air Force was already implementing plans to base four squadrons (60 missiles) under Project Emily —subsequently redefined as 20 Royal Air Force squadrons each with three missiles—of PGM-17 Thor IRBMs in Britain on airfields stretching from Yorkshire to East Anglia.

In 1958, the United States Air Force activated the 864th Strategic Missile Squadron at ABMA. Although the USAF briefly considered training its Jupiter crews at Vandenberg AFB, California, it later decided to conduct all of its training at Huntsville. In June and September of the same year the Air Force activated two more squadrons, the 865th and 866th.

In April 1959, the secretary of the Air Force issued implementing instructions to USAF to deploy two Jupiter squadrons to Italy. The two squadrons, totaling 30 missiles, were deployed at 10 sites in Italy from 1961 to 1963. They were operated by Italian Air Force crews, but USAF personnel controlled arming the nuclear warheads. The deployed missiles were under command of 36th Strategic Interdiction Air Brigade (36ª Aerobrigata Interdizione Strategica, Italian Air Force) at Gioia del Colle Air Base, Italy.

In October 1959, the location of the third and final Jupiter MRBM squadron was settled when a government-to-government agreement was signed with Turkey. The U.S. and Turkey concluded an agreement to deploy one Jupiter squadron on NATO's southern flank. One squadron totaling 15 missiles was deployed at five sites near İzmir, Turkey from 1961 to 1963, operated by USAF personnel, with the first flight of three Jupiter missiles turned over to the Türk Hava Kuvvetleri (Turkish Air Force) in late October 1962, but USAF personnel retaining control of nuclear warhead arming.

On four occasions between mid-October 1961 and August 1962, Jupiter mobile missiles carrying 1.4 megatons of TNT (5.9 PJ) nuclear warheads were struck by lightning at their bases in Italy. In each case, thermal batteries were activated, and on two occasions, tritium-deuterium "boost" gas was injected into the warhead pits, partially arming them. After the fourth lightning strike on a Jupiter MRBM, the USAF placed protective lightning strike-diversion tower arrays at all of the Italian and Turkish Jupiter MRBM missiles sites.

In 1962, a Bulgarian MiG-17 reconnaissance airplane was reported to have crashed into an olive grove near one of the U.S. Jupiter missile launch sites in Italy, after overflying the site.

By the time the Turkish Jupiters had been installed, the missiles were already largely obsolete and increasingly vulnerable to Soviet attacks. All Jupiter MRBMs were removed from service by April 1963, as a backdoor trade with the Soviets in exchange for their earlier removal of MRBMs from Cuba.

Deployment sites

United States
Redstone Arsenal, Huntsville, Alabama 
White Sands Missile Range, New Mexico 

Republic of Italy

Headquarters: Gioia del Colle Air Base, the launch sites (built in a triangular configuration) were in the direct vicinity of the villages Acquaviva delle Fonti, Altamura (two sites), Gioia del Colle, Gravina in Puglia, Laterza, Mottola, Spinazzola, Irsina and Matera.
Training Pad 
Squadron 1
Site 1 
Site 3 
Site 4 
Site 5 
Site 7 
Squadron 2
Site 2 
Site 6 
Site 8 
Site 9 
Site 10 

Turkish Republic
Headquarters: Çiğli Air Base
Training Pad 
Site 1 
Site 2 
Site 3 
Site 4 
Site 5

Description

Jupiter squadrons consisted of 15 missiles and approximately 500 military personnel with five "flights" of three missiles each, manned by five officers and 10 NCOs. To reduce vulnerability, the flights were located approximately 30 miles apart, with the triple launcher emplacements separated by a distance of several hundred miles.

The ground equipment for each emplacement was housed in approximately 20 vehicles; including two generator trucks, a power distribution truck, short- and long-range theodolites, a hydraulic and pneumatic truck and a liquid oxygen truck. Another trailer carried 6000 gallons of fuel and three liquid oxygen trailers each carried .

The missiles arrived at the emplacement on large trailers; while still on the trailer, the crew attached the hinged launch pedestal to the base of the missile which was hauled to an upright position using a winch. Once the missile was vertical, fuel and oxidizer lines were connected and the bottom third of the missile was encased in a "flower petal shelter", consisting of wedge-shaped metal panels, allowing crew members to service the missiles in all weather conditions. Once the fuel and oxidizer tanks were full, the launch controlling officer and two crewmen in a mobile launch control trailer could launch the missiles.

Each squadron was supported by a receipt, inspection and maintenance (RIM) area to the rear of the emplacements. RIM teams inspected new missiles and provided maintenance and repair to missiles in the field. Each RIM area also housed 25 tons of liquid oxygen and nitrogen generating plants. Several times a week, tanker trucks carried the fuel from the plant to the individual emplacements.

Specifications (Jupiter MRBM)
 Length: 60 ft (18.3 m)
 Diameter: 8 ft 9 in (2.67 m)
 Total Fueled Weight: 108,804 lb (49,353 kg)
 Empty Weight: 13,715 lb (6,221 kg)
 Oxygen (LOX) Weight: 68,760 lb (31,189 kg)
 RP-1 (kerosene) Weight: 30,415 lb (13,796 kg)
 Thrust: 150,000 lbf (667 kN)
 Engine:  Rocketdyne LR79-NA (Model S-3D)
 ISP: 247.5 s (2.43 kN·s/kg)
 Burning time: 2 min. 37 sec.
 Propellant consumption rate: 627.7 lb/s (284.7 kg/s)
 Range: 
 Flight time: 16 min 56.9 sec
 Cutoff velocity: 8,984 mph (14,458 km/h) – Mach 13.04
 Reentry velocity: 10,645 mph (17,131 km/h) – Mach 15.45
 Acceleration: 13.69 g (134 m/s²)
 Peak deceleration: 44.0 g (431 m/s²)
 Peak altitude: 
 CEP 4,925 ft (1,500 m)
 Warhead: 1.45 Mt Thermonuclear W49 – 1,650 lb (750 kg)
 Fusing: Proximity and Impact
 Guidance: Inertial

Launch vehicle derivatives

The Saturn I and Saturn IB rockets first stage was manufactured using the tooling from Jupiter and Redstone production, consisting of a central tank of the same diameter of the Jupiter missile with eight tanks of the same diameter as the Redstone clustered around it, all containing LOX/RP-1.

The Jupiter MRBM was also modified by adding upper stages, in the form of clustered Sergeant-derived rockets, to create a space launch vehicle called Juno II, not to be confused with the Juno I which was a Redstone-Jupiter-C missile development. There is also some confusion with another U.S. Army rocket called the Jupiter-C, which were Redstone missiles modified by lengthening the fuel tanks and adding small solid-fueled upper stages.

Specifications (Juno II launch vehicle)

The Juno II was a four-stage rocket derived from the Jupiter IRBM. It was used for 10 satellite launches, six of which failed. It launched Pioneer 3 (a partial success), Pioneer 4, Explorer 7, Explorer 8, and Explorer 11.
 Juno II total length: 24.0 m
 Orbit payload to 200 km: 41 kg
 Escape velocity payload: 6 kg
 First launch date: 6 December 1958
 Last launch date: 24 May 1961

Jupiter MRBM and Juno II launches
There were 46 test launches, all launched from Cape Canaveral Missile Annex, Florida.

1957

1958

1959

1960

1961

1962

1963

Former operators

 United States Air Force
 864th Strategic Missile Squadron
 865th Strategic Missile Squadron
 866th Strategic Missile Squadron

 ItalyAeronautica Militare (Italian Air Force)
 36ª Brigata Aerea Interdizione Strategica (36th Strategic Air Interdiction Brigade)

 TurkeyTürk Hava Kuvvetleri (Turkish Air Force)

Surviving examples

The Marshall Space Flight Center in Huntsville, Alabama displays a Jupiter missile in its Rocket Garden.

The U.S. Space & Rocket Center in Huntsville, Alabama displays two Jupiters, including one in Juno II configuration, in its Rocket Park.

An SM-78/PMG-19 is on display at the Air Force Space & Missile Museum at Cape Canaveral, Florida. The missile had been present in the rocket garden for many years until 2009 when it was taken down and given a complete restoration. This pristine artifact is now in sequestered storage in Hangar R on Cape Canaveral AFS and cannot be viewed by the general public.

A Jupiter (in Juno II configuration) is displayed in the Rocket Garden at Kennedy Space Center, Florida.  It was damaged by Hurricane Frances in 2004, but was repaired and subsequently placed back on display.

A PGM-19 is on display at the National Museum of the United States Air Force in Dayton, Ohio. The missile was obtained from the Chrysler Corporation in 1963. For decades it was displayed outside the museum, before being removed in 1998. The missile was restored by the museum's staff and was returned to display in the museum's new Missile Silo Gallery in 2007.

A PGM-19 is on display at the South Carolina State Fairgrounds in Columbia, South Carolina. The missile, named Columbia, was presented to the city in the early 1960s by the US Air Force. It was installed at the fairgrounds in 1969 at a cost of $10,000.

Air Power Park in Hampton, Virginia displays an SM-78.

The Virginia Museum of Transportation in downtown Roanoke, Virginia displays a Jupiter PGM-19.

The Frontiers of Flight Museum at Dallas Love Field in Dallas, Texas, has a Jupiter missile on display outdoors.

See also
 List of United States Air Force missile squadrons
 List of missiles
 M-numbers
 Strategic Air Command
 Theatre ballistic missiles

Notes

References

Citations

Bibliography

External links

 Jupiter IRBM History, U.S. Army – Redstone Arsenal
 Jupiter IRBM, Encyclopedia Astronautica
 The Jupiter Missiles of Turkey, G. L. Smith
 Detailed spherical panoramas inside the aft (engine) compartment
 Jupiter-A at Astronautix.com
 Jupiter in Italy
 Jupiter SM-78

1957 in spaceflight
1958 in spaceflight
1959 in spaceflight
1960 in spaceflight
1961 in spaceflight
Cold War missiles of the United States
Medium-range ballistic missiles of the United States
Nuclear missiles of the United States
Space launch vehicles of the United States
Theatre ballistic missiles
Military equipment introduced in the 1950s